Jugging is the process of stewing whole animals, mainly game or fish, for an extended period in a tightly covered container such as a casserole or an earthenware jug.
In France a similar stew of a game animal (historically thickened with the animal's blood) is known as a civet.

Jugged hare

One common traditional dish that involves jugging is jugged hare (a similar stew is known as civet de lièvre in France), which is a whole hare, cut into pieces, marinated and cooked with red wine and juniper berries in a tall jug that stands in a pan of water.  It is traditionally served with the hare's blood  (or the blood is added right at the very end of the cooking process) and port wine.

Jugged hare is described in the influential 18th-century cookbook, The Art of Cookery by Hannah Glasse, with a recipe titled, "A Jugged Hare", that begins, "Cut it into little pieces, lard them here and there ..." The recipe goes on to describe cooking the pieces of hare in water in a jug that is set within a bath of boiling water to cook for three hours.  Beginning in the nineteenth century, Glasse has been widely credited with having started the recipe with the words "First, catch your hare". This attribution is apocryphal. Her actual directions are, "Take your Hare when it is cas'd, and make a pudding ..." To 'case' means to take off the skin [not "to catch"]. Both the Oxford English Dictionary and The Dictionary of National Biography discuss the attribution.

However, having a freshly caught, or shot, hare enables one to obtain its blood. A freshly killed hare is prepared for jugging by removing its entrails and then hanging it in a larder by its hind legs, which causes the blood to accumulate in the chest cavity. One method of preserving the blood after draining it from the hare (since the hare itself is usually hung for a week or more) is to mix it with red wine vinegar in order to prevent it coagulating, and then to store it in a freezer.

Many other British cookbooks from before the middle of the 20th century have recipes for jugged hare. Merle and Reitch have this to say about Jugged Hare, for example:

In 2006, a survey of 2021 people for the television channel UKTV Food found that only 1.6% of the people aged under 25 recognized jugged hare by name. 7 out of 10 of those people stated that they would refuse to eat jugged hare if it were served at the house of a friend or a relative.

Civet de lapin
Civet de lapin (rabbit stew) is an alternative to civet de lièvre. It is considered a speciality of the cuisine of Martinique.

Jugged kippers
Another jugged dish, also traditional in the United Kingdom, is jugged kippers, which is kippers (with the heads and tails removed) in a covered jug, cooked in boiling water.  Recipe books recommend jugging kippers as one way of avoiding the strong smell that kippers have.

See also

 List of cooking techniques
 List of meat dishes

References

Further reading 
  Mrs Beeton's recipe for Jugged Hare
  Another detailed recipe, with alternatives
  Bishop's recipe includes a note that "in some parts of the country" the hare is cooked in ale with bacon.
  A recipe for Jugged Steak
  A modern French recipe for civet de lièvre, using a pressure cooker
  Two recipes for jugging pigeons

Blood dishes
Cooking techniques
Meat dishes
Stews